Shirley Campbell may refer to:

Shirley Aley Campbell, (1925–2018), American painter of the Contemporary Figurative Realism movement
Shirley Campbell Barr, (born 1965), Afro-Costa Rican activist and poet